Montague Island may refer to:
 Barunguba / Montague Island, New South Wales, Australia
 Montague Island (Alaska), U.S.
 Montague Island (Baja California), Mexico
 Montague Island, former name of Peel Island, Cumbria, England

See also 
 Montague (disambiguation)